Landser may refer to:
 A German colloquial term for a German army soldier, particularly used during World War II
 Landser (band), a German Neo-Nazi band
 Der Landser, a German pulp magazine published weekly from 1957 through 2013, featuring stories in a World War II setting
 Landser, Haut-Rhin, a town in Alsace, France

See also
Landseer (disambiguation)